The Banat of Temeswar or Banat of Temes was a Habsburg province that existed between 1718 and 1778. It was located in the present day region of Banat, which was named after this province. The province was abolished in 1778 and the following year it was incorporated into the Habsburg Kingdom of Hungary.

Duality of name 

History 

Before the Habsburg province was established, several other entities had existed in the Banat region, including: the Voivodeship of Glad (9th century), the Voivodeship of Ahtum (11th century), the medieval Kingdom of Hungary (11th - 16th century) and one of its frontier provinces
the Banate of Severin (from 1233 to the 16th century), the Ottoman province named Eyalet of Temeşvar (1552–1716), and the Banate of Lugos and Karansebes province within the Principality of Transylvania (16th–17th century), which was under the suzerainty of the Ottoman Empire as a whole.

Although after the Austro-Ottoman war (1683–1697) and before the treaty of Karlowitz (1699) most parts of Banat were temporarily controlled by the forces of Prince Eugene of Savoy; in consequence of the treaty, the Ottoman sovereignty was recognized over the region with the fort of Temeşvar. However, as a result of the Spanish Succession War and the Rákóczi's War for Independence, the Habsburgs were inclined to direct their attention elsewhere within their country, and there was no attempt on their part to gain any territories from the Ottomans until 1710.

In the Austro-Turkish War of 1716-18, Prince Eugene of Savoy conquered the Banat region from the Ottoman Empire, which was recognized by the Treaty of Passarowitz (1718). The Habsburg monarchy then established a new military administrative region there under the name of Banat of Temeswar. The capital of the province became Temeswar. The province remained under military administration until 1751 when civil administration was introduced in northern parts of the region by Empress Maria Theresa of Austria.

From 1718 to 1739, Banat of Temeswar included not only the Banat region, but also parts of present-day eastern Serbia along the southern bank of the Danube river. Following the Treaty of Belgrade (1739), areas along the southern bank of Danube returned under Ottoman control. In 1751, the southern parts of Banat were excluded from the province and the Banatian Military Frontier was established in that area.

The Banat of Temeswar was abolished on 6 June 1778, and on 23 April 1779, it was incorporated into the Habsburg Kingdom of Hungary, while its former territory was divided into three counties: Torontál, Temes and Krassó. The southern part of the Banat region, which was part of the Banat of Temeswar until 1751, remained part of the Military Frontier (Banat Krajina) until 1873.

In 1849 following the Revolutions of 1848/1849 the Banat of Temeswar was resurrected as part of the new Voivodeship of Serbia and Banat of Temeswar crown land, which combined the former lands of the Banat of Temeswar with most of those from the self-proclaimed Serbian Vojvodina (excluding those parts of both within the military frontier). It was once again abolished in 1860; the counties were restored and re-merged into Hungary.

Population 

The province was bound to repopulate after the Habsburg conquest because it had a low population density on the grounds that the territory sustained a lot of adversity from the previous wars. The population density was among the lowest in Europe; some researchers suggest that it was around 1 person / square kilometres.  According to the first census conducted by the Habsburg military authorities, the population of Banat numbered about 20,000 inhabitants, mostly Serbs. The former Muslim population of Banat had left the area immediately before and during the Habsburg conquest. The low population density resulted in the territory being repopulated by German families coming from Austrian and southern German lands, Romanians coming from Wallachia and Transylvania, by Slovaks from the north, and by Serb refugees coming from the Ottoman Empire, while some Serbs arrived in the area from other parts of the Habsburg monarchy. Colonization of various ethnic groups in the area lasted until the early 19th century. The government organized regimental districts which mostly had Serb population with special privileges in exchange for defending the borders. The area also lost its Hungarian population in the 16th century, but Hungarians were not allowed to return until the 1740s, because the Habsburgs regarded them as "politically unreliable". Thus, Hungarians were almost totally absent from Banat in the first half of the 18th century. After the permission was given, Hungarian settlers arrived from different parts of the kingdom (mainly from Transdanubia, Csongrád county and the Jász and Kun districts).

According to data from 1774, the population of the Banat of Temeswar was composed of: 
 Romanians = 220,000
 Serbs and Greeks = 100,000
 Germans = 53,000
 Hungarians and Bulgarians = 2,400
 Jews = 340

The first official census took part during the rule of Joseph II, from the late 18th century.  This shows Romanian majority in the east, Serbian in the west, and numerous German population in the whole area.

Governors  
Governors of Banat of Temeswar did not have the title of "ban". They were military governors and chefs of provincial administration (in German: Militärpräsidenten der Landesadministration des Temescher Banats).
 Claudius Florimund Mercy (1716–1734)
 Johann Andreas von Hamilton (1734–1738)
 Wilhelm Reinhard von Neipperg (1738–1739)
 August Jakob Heinrich von Suckow (1739–1740)
 Franz Anton Leopold Ponz von Engelshofen (1740–1757)
 Ferdinand Philipp von Harsch (1757–1758)
 Anton von Puebla (1758–1759)
 Siegmund Friedrich Samuel von Lietzen (1759–1769)
 Maximilian Joseph von Mitrowsky (1769–1775)
 Johann Franz Anton von Zedtwitz (1775–1779)

See also 
 Banat
 Banat Krajina
 Ottoman Province of Temeşvar

References

Sources

 
 
 
 Marin, Irina. Contested Frontiers in the Balkans: Ottoman, Habsburg, and Communist Rivalries in Eastern Europe (I.B. Tauris, distributed by Palgrave Macmillan; 2013) 228 pages; focuses on the Banat of Temesvar
 Miodrag Milin, Vekovima zajedno (Iz istorije srpsko-rumunskih odnosa), Temišvar, 1995.
 Dušan J. Popović, Srbi u Vojvodini, vol. 2, Novi Sad, 1990.
 Peter Rokai – Zoltan Đere – Tibor Pal – Aleksandar Kasaš, Istorija Mađara, Beograd, 2002.
 Denis Šehić – Demir Šehić, Istorijski atlas Sveta, Beograd, 2007.
 Milan Tutorov, Banatska rapsodija – istorika Zrenjanina i Banata, Novi Sad, 2001.
 Forţiu, Sorin. Denumirea Banatului în epoca modernă (sec. XVIII - XX): Banatus Timisvariensis vel Banatus Temesiensis?, in: Descoperiţi Banatul - Timişoara, Biblioteca Banaterra - Cartea 1, Editura Waldpress, Timişoara, 2009, 192 pg., ISBN 978-973 -7878-44-1; p. 104-144.
 J. H. Šviker, Politička istorija Srba u Ugarskoj, Novi Sad – Beograd, 1998.

External links 
 Map
 Map
 The Banat, 1718–1778
 Some basic info on Banat
 Sorin Forţiu: Denumirea Banatului în epoca modernă (sec. XVIII - XX): Banatus Timisvariensis vel Banatus Temesiensis?

 
1718 establishments in the Habsburg monarchy
1778 disestablishments in the Habsburg monarchy